Mocha is a Chilean town. It is located approximately 70km northeast of Huara, in the Tarapacá Region, Chile. The town is situated in commune of Huara. Mocha is a livestock and crop dependent town, where it depends on the Quebrada de Tarapacá River.

References 

Populated places in Tarapacá Region
Communes of Chile